The 2012 Cronulla-Sutherland Sharks season is the 46th in the club's history. Coached by Shane Flanagan and captained by Paul Gallen, they competed in the NRL's 2012 Telstra Premiership, finishing the regular season 7th (out of 16). The Sharks were then knocked out of contention in their first game of the finals against the Canberra Raiders.

Ladder

Results
Round 1 – Tigers vs Sharks (Loss 17 - 16)
 Tries – Isaac De Gois, Colin Best, Todd Carney

Round 2 – Sharks vs Knights (Loss 6 - 18)
 Tries – Ben Pomeroy

Round 3 – Sharks vs Sea Eagles (Win 17 - 14)
 Tries – Jayson Bukuya, Nathan Gardner, Ben Pomeroy

Round 4 – Cowboys vs Sharks (Win 20 - 14)
 Tries – Andrew Fifita, Ben Pomeroy, Paul Gallen

Round 5 – Panthers vs Sharks (Win 14 - 15)
 Tries – Jayson Bukuya, Wade Graham

Round 6 – Sharks vs Dragons (Win 12 - 0)
 Tries – John Morris, Wade Graham
 
Round 7 – Sharks vs Eels (Win 24 – 18)
 Tries – Matthew Wright, Ben Pomeroy, Jayson Bukuya, Stewart Mills

Round 8 – Raiders vs Sharks (Win 22 - 44)
 Tries – John Williams (2), Ben Pomeroy, Jayson Bukuya, John Morris, Stewart Mills, Jeff Robson, Colin Best

Round 9 – Rabbitohs vs Sharks (Loss 34 - 28)
 Tries - Todd Carney, Jeff Robson, Stewart Mills. Colin Best, Ben Pomeroy

Round 10 – Sharks vs Storm (Win 12 - 10)
 Tries – Isaac Gordon, Jeremy Smith

Round 11 – Bulldogs vs Sharks (Loss 26 – 6)
 Tries – Jeremy Smith

Round 12 – BYE
Round 13 – Eels vs Sharks (Loss 29 - 20)
 Tries – Isaac Gordon, Colin Best, Paul Gallen

Round 14 – Sharks vs Titans (Win 22 - 12)
 Tries - Jeremy Smith, Chad Townsend, Colin Best, Isaac De Gois

Round 15 – Sharks vs Warriors (Win 20 - 19)
 Tries – Jeff Robson (2), Ben Pomeroy

Round 16 – BYE
Round 17 – Broncos - (Win 12 - 26)
 Tries – Colin Best(2), Wade Graham, Ben Pomeroy Nathan Stapleton,

Round 18 – Sharks vs Roosters (Drew 14 - 14)
 Tries – Ricky Leutele, Ben Pomeroy

Round 19 – Dragons vs Sharks (Loss 18 - 10)
 Tries - Wade Graham(2)

Round 20 – Sharks vs Raiders (Loss 4 - 36) 
 Tries - Mark Taufua

Round 21 – Sharks vs Panthers (Loss 20 - 21)
 Tries - Ricky Leutele(2), Jeff Robson, Tyson Frizell

Round 22 – Warriors vs Sharks (Win 4 - 45)
 Tries - Todd Carney(2), Andrew Fifita(2), John Williams(2), Jeff Robson

Round 23 – Knights vs Sharks (Loss 26 - 4)
 Tries - John Williams

Round 24 – Sharks vs Rabbitohs (Win 20 - 7)
 Tries - Andrew Fifita, Tyson Frizell, John Williams

Round 25 – Storm vs Sharks - (Loss 20 - 18)
 Tries - Sam Tagataese, Nathan Stapleton, Isaac Gordon

Round 26 – Sharks vs Cowboys (Loss 22 - 36)
 Tries - Colin Best, Isaac De Gois, Paul Gallen, Andrew Fifita

Finals Week 1 - Raiders vs Sharks (Loss - 34 - 16)
 Tries - Ricky Leutele, Wade Graham, Nathan Stapleton

Team stats 
(Regular Season)
Most Points – Todd Carney - 139
Most Tries – Ben Pomeroy - 9
Most Conversions – Todd Carney - 46
Most Penalty Goals – Todd Carney - 14
Most Field Goals – Todd Carney - 3
Most Try Assists – Todd Carney - 10
Most Line Breaks – Colin Best - 13
Most All Runs – Paul Gallen - 347
Most Offloads – Paul Gallen - 48
Most Kicks in Play – Todd Carney - 213

References

Cronulla-Sutherland Sharks seasons
Cronulla-Sutherland Sharks season